Brian McGee may refer to:
 Brian McGee (bishop) (born 1965), Scottish Roman Catholic prelate, Bishop of Argyll and the Isles (since 2016)
 Brian McGee (drummer) (born 1959), Scottish drummer with the bands Simple Minds, Engames and Propaganda
 Brian McGee, American singer and guitarist of Plow United

See also
Brian Magee (disambiguation)